The sagas of Icelanders, also known as family sagas, are one genre of Icelandic sagas. They are prose narratives mostly based on historical events that mostly took place in Iceland in the ninth, tenth, and early eleventh centuries, during the so-called Saga Age. They were written in Old Icelandic, a western dialect of Old Norse. They are the best-known specimens of Icelandic literature.

They are focused on history, especially genealogical and family history. They reflect the struggle and conflict that arose within the societies of the early generations of Icelandic settlers. The Icelandic sagas are valuable and unique historical sources about medieval Scandinavian societies and kingdoms, in particular in regards to pre-Christian religion and culture and heroic age.

Eventually many of these Icelandic sagas were recorded, mostly in the 13th and 14th centuries. The 'authors', or rather recorders of these sagas are largely unknown. One saga, Egil's Saga, is believed by some scholars to have been written by Snorri Sturluson, a descendant of the saga's hero, but this remains uncertain. The standard modern edition of Icelandic sagas is produced by Hið íslenzka fornritafélag ('The Old Icelandic Text Society'), or Íslenzk fornrit for short.

Historical time frame 
Among the several literary reviews of the sagas is the Sagalitteraturen by Sigurður Nordal, which divides the sagas into five chronological groups (depending on when they were written not their subject matters) distinguished by the state of literary development:

 1200 to 1230 – Sagas that deal with skalds (such as Fóstbrœðra saga)
 1230 to 1280 – Family sagas (such as Laxdæla saga)
 1280 to 1300 – Works that focus more on style and storytelling than just writing down history (such as Njáls saga)
 Early fourteenth century – Historical tradition
 Fourteenth century – Fiction

List of sagas 
 Atla saga Ótryggssonar
 Bandamanna saga
 Bárðar saga Snæfellsáss
 Bjarnar saga Hítdælakappa
 Droplaugarsona saga
 Egils saga Skalla-Grímssonar – Egil's Saga
 Eiríks saga rauða – Saga of Erik the Red
 Eyrbyggja saga
 Færeyinga saga
 Finnboga saga ramma
 Fljótsdæla saga
 Flóamanna saga
 Fóstbræðra saga (two versions)
 Gísla saga Súrssonar, (two versions) of an outlaw poet – Gísla saga
 Grettis saga – Saga of Grettir the Strong
 Grænlendinga saga – Greenland saga
 Gull-Þóris saga
 Gunnars saga Keldugnúpsfífls
 Gunnlaugs saga ormstungu
 Hallfreðar saga (two versions)
 Harðar saga ok Hólmverja
 Hávarðar saga Ísfirðings – The saga of Hávarður of Ísafjörður
 Heiðarvíga saga
 Hrafnkels saga
 Hrana saga hrings (post-medieval)
 Hænsna-Þóris saga
Íslendingabók (One of the earliest sagas written about the founding of Iceland by a priest called Ari Þorgilsson working in the early 12th century)
 Kjalnesinga saga
 Kormáks saga
 Króka-Refs saga
 Laxdæla saga
 Ljósvetninga saga (three versions)
 Njáls saga
 Reykdæla saga ok Víga-Skútu
 Skáld-Helga saga (known only from rímur and later derivations of these)
 Svarfdæla saga
 Valla-Ljóts saga
 Vatnsdæla saga
 Víga-Glúms saga
 Víglundar saga
 Vápnfirðinga saga
 Þorsteins saga hvíta
 Þorsteins saga Síðu-Hallssonar
 Þórðar saga hreðu
 Ölkofra saga
It is thought that a small number of sagas are now lost, including the supposed Gauks saga Trandilssonar – The saga of Gaukur á Stöng.

See also 
 Norse saga
 Family saga

References

Further reading 
 Arnold, Martin (2003). The Post-Classical Icelandic Family Saga. Lewiston, New York: Edwin Mellen Press
 Ármann Jakobsson (2013). Nine Saga Studies: The Critical Interpretation of the Icelandic Sagas. Reykjavík: University of Iceland Press. . 
 Falk, Oren. 2021. Violence and Risk in Medieval Iceland: This Spattered Isle. Oxford University Press.
 Karlsson, Gunnar (2000). The History of Iceland. Minneapolis: University of Minnesota Press
 Liestøl, Knut (1930). The Origin of the Icelandic Family Sagas. Translated by Jayne, Arthur Garland. Cambridge, Massachusetts: Harvard University Press. .
 Miller, William Ian (2009). Bloodtaking and Peacemaking: Feud, Law, and Society in Saga Iceland. Chicago: University of Chicago Press. . 
 Smiley, Jane; Kellogg, Robert Leland (2001). The Sagas of Icelanders: a selection. New York: Penguin Books. . 
 Viðar Hreinsson (eds.) (1997). The Complete Sagas of Icelanders. 5 vols. Reykjavík: Leifur Eiriksson Publishing. .  – see

External links 
 Icelandic Saga Database – many sagas of Icelanders, along with some translations into English and other languages
Proverbs and Proverbial Materials in the Old Icelandic Sagas from the University of Alaska
 Icelandic sagas – a selection in Old Norse
 Sagnanet – photographs of some of the original manuscripts
 Harmony of the Vinland voyages
 Icelandic Saga Map – an online digital map with the geo-referenced texts of all of the Íslendingasögur

Sagas of Icelanders
Medieval literature
Icelandic literature
Iceland history-related lists